Yobe State University is located in Damaturu, Yobe State, Nigeria. It was founded in 2006.
The institution has grown steadily and currently offers programmes under several faculties, like; Faculty of Arts, Social & Management Science, Faculty of Science and Faculty of Law.

Departments and courses 

 Arabic

 Islamic studies

 Hausa

 English

 History

 Education

 Sharia Law

 Civil Law

 Chemistry

 Physiology

 Computer Science

 Biological science
 Mathematics and Statistics

 Physics

 Accounting

 Business Administration

 Geography

 Political Science

 Economics

 Sociology

References

External links
Yobe State University Official website

Universities and colleges in Nigeria
Yobe State
Educational institutions established in 2006
2006 establishments in Nigeria
Public universities in Nigeria